Anne Hamilton may refer to:

 Anne Hamilton (1766–1846), friend of Queen Caroline
 Anne Hamilton, Countess of Huntly (1535–in or after 1574), daughter of James Hamilton, Duke of Chatellerault
 Anne Hamilton, 3rd Duchess of Hamilton (1631–1716), daughter of Sir James Hamilton, 1st Duke of Hamilton
 Lord Anne Hamilton (1709–1748), son of James Hamilton, 4th Duke of Hamilton
 Anne Hamilton, Duchess of Hamilton (1720–1771)
 Anne Hamilton, 2nd Countess of Ruglen (1698–1748)

See also
 Ann Hamilton (disambiguation)